Sheila Kanieson Ransom (b. 1954, Five Nations Haudenosaunee, New York) is an artist known for her sweetgrass and black ash basket making. Her weaving represents her efforts in preserving Akwesasne culture. Her work is in the New York State Museum and the Hood Museum of Art. Her work, Pope Basket, was acquired by the Smithsonian American Art Museum as part of the Renwick Gallery's 50th Anniversary Campaign in 2022. In 2012, Ransom gifted a version of Pope Basket to Pope Benedict XVI after the canonization of Kateri Tekakwitha.

References

1954 births
Living people
People from New York (state)
20th-century women artists
Native American women artists
Basket weavers